Tauqeer Dar (born 31 January 1964) is a former field hockey player from Pakistan. He was the member of the winning Pakistani team in 1984 Summer Olympics. He is the son of Munir Ahmad Dar and the nephew of Tanvir Dar. He is also the son-in-law of Khawaja Zaka-ud-Din who was the head-coach of Pakistani hockey team for 1984 Summer Olympics.

He later became a coach for the Pakistan Hockey Team.

See also
Pakistan Hockey Federation

References

External links
 

1964 births
Pakistani male field hockey players
Olympic field hockey players of Pakistan
Field hockey players at the 1984 Summer Olympics
Olympic gold medalists for Pakistan
Living people
Olympic medalists in field hockey
Medalists at the 1984 Summer Olympics
Pakistani field hockey coaches